Withers Broadcasting Companies is a radio broadcasting company based in southern Illinois. Founded in 1972 by the late W. Russell Withers, Jr., and now owned by his daughter Dana Withers, the company owns several radio stations across the United States, mainly in Southern Illinois and Southeast Missouri.

Radio stations

Illinois

Centralia
WILY 1210
WRXX 95.3

Harrisburg
WEBQ 1240
WEBQ-FM 102.3

Marion
WFRX 1300/95.5
WDDD-FM 107.3
WHET 97.7
WVZA 92.7
WTAO-FM 105.1
WISH-FM 98.9

Metropolis
WMOK 920

Nashville
WNSV  104.7

Mount Vernon
WDML 106.9
WMIX 940
WMIX-FM 94.1

Kentucky

Paducah
WGKY 95.9
WREZ 105.5
WZZL 106.7

Missouri

Cape Girardeau
KAPE 1550
KGMO 100.7
KREZ 104.7
KYRX 97.3
WKIB 96.5

Jackson
KJXX 1170

Sikeston
KRHW 1520
KBHI 107.1
KBXB 97.9

Former television stations
Stations arranged alphabetically by state and by city of license.

Notes:
1 Owned by John Harvey Rees, Withers operated KJWA/KFQX through a local marketing agreement from 1994 until Withers sold operating station KREX-TV to Hoak Media in 2003.
2 KREZ-TV was operated as a satellite of KREX, until the station was sold to Lee Enterprises in 1995, becoming a satellite of Albuquerque station KRQE.
3 Owned by VictoriaVision, Inc., Withers operated KVCT through a local marketing agreement from 1995 until Withers sold operating station KAVU-TV to Saga Communications in 1999.
4 WVFX operated on analog channel 46, until the digital transition completed in 2009, when it decided to use its digital allotment (VHF channel 10) as its virtual channel.

References

External links
Official Website

Radio broadcasting companies of the United States